The RABe 520 is an electric multiple unit used since 2002 by the Swiss Federal Railways. It is based on the Stadler GTW 2/8 model.

Features 

The RABe 520 is slightly different from the standard Stadler GTW model: it has a greater capacity, a narrower body and an increased number of doors.

Service 

As a quite small train, the RABe 520 is used on regional and S-Bahn lines.
It was first designed for the Seetalbahn line between Lenzburg and Luzern, and was also used on lines from and to both locations. The RABe 520 gradually saw use on other lines.
As of 2010, it can be seen on these routes :
 S-Bahn Luzern :
 Luzern - Lenzburg (S9)
 Luzern - Brunnen (S3)
 S-Bahn Aargau :
 Lenzburg – Zofingen (S28)
 Lenzburg/Othmarsingen – Rotkreuz (S26)
 Aarau - Turgi

See also 
List of stock used by Swiss Federal Railways
Thurbo

Notes and references 

Multiple units of Switzerland
Train-related introductions in 2002
Stadler Rail multiple units
15 kV AC multiple units